A treaty battleship was a battleship built in the 1920s or 1930s under the terms of one of a number of international treaties governing warship construction. Many of these ships played an active role in the Second World War, but few survived long after it.

The first of the treaties was the Washington Naval Treaty signed in 1922, the world's five naval powers agreed to abide by strict restrictions on the construction of battleships and battlecruisers, in order to prevent an arms race in naval construction such as preceded World War I. The Treaty limited the number of capital ships possessed by each signatory, and also the total tonnage of each navy's battleships. New ships could only be constructed to replace the surviving ships as they retired after 20 years' service. Furthermore, any new ship would be limited to guns of 16-inch caliber and a displacement of 35,000 tons.

The Washington Treaty limits were extended and modified by the London Naval Treaty of 1930 and the Second London Naval Treaty of 1936. During the 1930s, however, the effectiveness of these agreements broke down, as some signatory powers (in particular Japan) withdrew from the treaty arrangements and others only paid lip service to them. By 1938, Britain and the USA had both invoked an 'escalator clause' in the Second London Treaty which allowed battleships of up to 45,000 tons displacement, and the Treaty was effectively defunct.

The strict limits on displacement forced the designers of battleships to make compromises which they might have wished to avoid given the choice. The 1920s and 1930s saw a number of innovations in battleship design, particularly in engines, underwater protection, and aircraft.

Background 
After World War I ended in 1918, a large number of treaties aiming to ensure peace were signed. According to historian Larry Addington it was "the greatest effort to that time to control armaments and to discourage war through treaty". These treaties ranged from the Treaty of Versailles, which contained provisions were intended to make the Reichswehr incapable of offensive action and to encourage international disarmament, to the Kellogg–Briand Pact of 1928, in which signatory states promised not to use war to resolve "disputes or conflicts of whatever nature or of whatever origin they may be, which may arise among them". Specific naval treaties that emerged during this era include the Washington Naval Treaty in 1921 and the London Naval Treaty in 1930.

In the latter half of and after World War I, the United States embarked on a large battleship construction program, with the passage of the Naval Act of 1916 allowing for the construction of ten battleships. The Naval Appropriations Act of 1917 authorized the construction of a further three battleships, to the point that it was projected the United States would be comparable to the Royal Navy in strength by 1923 or 1924. In response, the British Navy began campaigning for a ship building program, proposing building the G3 battlecruisers. Such proposals were unpopular and viewed as unnecessarily expensive. The Japanese government was also embarking on a large program of warship building. Britain was eager to engage in naval limitation talks, fearing the danger America's aggressive ship building posed to their empire. All three countries were open to negotiations as a result of the massive cost of building and maintaining a large navy.

Treaties 
In December 1919, former British Foreign Secretary Lord Grey of Fallodon and Secretary of State for Foreign Affairs Lord Robert Cecil met Edward M. House, the adviser of Woodrow Wilson, in Washington, D.C. At the meeting, the United States temporarily agreed to slow battleship building in exchange for the British withdrawing their opposition to inclusion of the Monroe Doctrine in the League of Nations Covenant.

Washington Naval Treaty 
From 12 November 1921 to 6 February 1922, the Washington Naval Conference was held to stop a naval arms race from emerging. Nine nations attended at the request of Secretary of State Charles Evans Hughes; the United States, Japan, China, France, Britain, Italy, Belgium, Netherlands and Portugal. The conference led to the Nine-Power Treaty, which reaffirmed support for the Open Door Policy towards China; the Four-Power Treaty in which the  United States, United Kingdom, France and Japan agreed to maintain the status quo in the Pacific, by respecting the Pacific territories of the other countries signing the agreement, not seeking further territorial expansion, and mutual consultation with each other in the event of a dispute over territorial possessions.

The most important treaty signed during the conference was the Washington Naval Treaty, or Five-Power Treaty, between the United States, Britain, Japan, France, and Italy. The treaty strictly limited both the tonnage and construction of capital ships and aircraft carriers and included limits of the size of individual ships. The tonnage limits defined by Articles IV and VII limited the United States and Great Britain to 525,000 tons in their capital fleets, Japan to 310,000 tons and France and Italy to 178,000 tons. It instituted a 10-year "battleship building holiday". No agreements were reached on cruiser tonnage amounts and submarines. The treaty limited capital ships (battleships and battlecruisers, defined as any warship with guns more than 8-inch in caliber and 10,000 tons standard displacement) to 35,000 tons standard displacement and guns of no larger than 16-inch calibre.

Chapter II, Part 2, detailed what was to be done to render a ship ineffective for military use. In addition to sinking or scrapping, a limited number of ships could be converted as target ships or training vessels if their armament, armour and other combat-essential parts were removed completely.  Part 3, Section II specified the ships to be scrapped to comply with the treaty and when the remaining ships could be replaced. In all, the United States had to scrap 26 existing or planned capital ships, Britain 24 and Japan 16.

Geneva Naval Conferences 

The First Geneva Naval Conference was a meeting of the United States, Great Britain and Japan (France and Italy declined to engage in further negotiations) called together by Calvin Coolidge in 1927. The aim of the Conference was to extend the existing limits on naval construction which had been agreed in the Washington Naval Treaty. The Washington Treaty had limited the construction of battleships and aircraft carriers, but had not limited the construction of cruisers, destroyers or submarines. The British proposed limiting battleships to be under 30,000 tons, with 15-inch guns. The Conference ended with no agreement reached. The Second Geneva Naval Conference in 1932 similarly ended without an agreement, after nations deadlocked over rearmament of Germany.

London Treaties 

The limits set in the Washington Naval Treaty were reiterated by the London Naval Treaty signed in 1930. A limit of 57,000 tons for submarines was decided upon, and the battleship building holiday was extended for a further ten years. Signed in 1936, the Second London Naval Treaty further limited guns to 14-inch calibre. The Second London Treaty contained a clause which allowed construction of battleships with 16-inch guns if any of the signatories of the Washington Treaty failed to ratify the new one. It contained an additional clause which allowed displacement restrictions to be relaxed if non-signatories built vessels more powerful than the treaty allowed.

Battleships 
The Washington and London Naval treaty limitations meant that fewer new battleships were launched in 1919–1939 than in 1905–1914 due to an imposed battleship construction holiday, which ended in 1933. They also inhibited development by imposing upper limits on the weights of ships. Designs like the projected British  battleship, the first American , and the Japanese —all of which continued the trend to larger ships with bigger guns and thicker armor—never finished construction.

The  was laid down on 1 June 1918. It was one of the largest battleships in the world at the time, and at the Washington Naval Conference, the United Kingdom and United States urged the abandonment of the project. However, it was allowed under the condition that the US and UK got two additional 16-inch gun ships. Upon the signing of the Washington Naval Treaty, Amagi and Tosa were abandoned and Kaga and Akagi were converted to 30,000-ton aircraft carriers. While a party to the treaty, Japan completely halted construction of battleships, instead focusing on battlecruisers. They embarked on an extensive cruiser building program, and began aggressively modernizing naval equipment. Two were completed during World War II and a third was converted to an aircraft carrier.

The United States was allowed to keep three Colorado-class battleships that had been funded in the Naval Act of 1916 and a total of 500,360 tons of capital ships in the Washington Naval Treaty. Reduced naval spending by the Republican Party led to the navy remaining well below the maximum size specified in the treaty. Construction on several others was stopped, and the hull of the abandoned USS Washington was used for testing resistance to bombs, torpedoes and gunfire. Technical development and research towards battleships was severely restricted. The United States decommissioned a total of sixteen existing battleships, and stopped construction on the six ships of the first South Dakota class. The United States modernized their fleet but did not build up to treaty limits. The battleship holiday was extremely popular among the general public. The ships of the  had their gun elevations increased although the British argued it was a violation of the terms of the Washington Naval Treaty.

The Royal Navy scrapped or stopped construction on sixteen ships as a result of the Washington Naval Treaty. (40,000 tons displacement) was exempted from the restrictions set by the treaty. Their navy, while it remained the largest in the world until 1933, became increasingly out of date. Though the Royal Navy had the most battleships active at the outbreak of World War II, all but two dated back to World War I or earlier. As a result of the battleship building holiday, the Armstrong and Beardmore shipyards were forced to close.

France and Italy did not embark on large naval expansion programs, though the French battleship Béarn was converted to an aircraft carrier.

List of treaty battleships

Completed between the end of World War I and the signing of the Washington Naval Treaty

Aftermath 
The Washington Naval Treaty was signed by the US, UK, Japan, France and Italyall the principal naval powers. At various stages Italy and France opted out of further negotiations; however, their economic resources did not permit the development of super-battleships. Germany, while not permitted any battleships by the Treaty of Versailles, developed one in the 1930s; this was legitimised by the Anglo-German Naval Agreement, which placed Germany under the same legal limits as Britain.

Japan's policies were largely decided by militarists through the 1930s. Partially influenced by the passage of the Vinson-Trammell Act in 1934, and the National Industrial Recovery Act of 1933, in 1934 Japan announced  they planned to leave the treaty system in two years. At the Second London conference, Japan showed willingness to negotiate, but left the conference in January 1936 and other treaties expired on December 31, 1936. They built mammoth treaty-busting battleshipsthe Yamato class.

As a result of the treaties, by the time rearmament began in the 1930s, before the onset of World War II, the world's battleships were largely aging and obsolete due to the rise of air power and increasing use of submarines. As a result, dreadnought technology had dramatically improved, and the building of new and upgrading old battleships began in earnest.

References

Bibliography
Books and journals
 
 
 
 
 
 
 

 
 
 
 
 
 
 

Websites
 
 
 
 
 
 
 
 

Arms control
Battleships
World War II battleships
Naval history of Germany
History of the Royal Navy
Naval history of Japan
History of the French Navy
Naval history of Italy
History of the United States Navy